Gadgil is a Chitpavan brahmin surname from Maharashtra, India.

Notable persons
Anant Gadgil (born 1956), Indian politician
Anant "Dajikaka" Gadgil (1915–2014), Indian jeweller, founder of P. N. Gadgil Jewellers & Company in Pune
Arvinn Gadgil (born 1980), Norwegian Socialist Left Party politician of Indian descent
Ashok Gadgil (born 1950), Director of the Energy and Environmental Technologies Division at Lawrence Berkeley National Laboratory
Dhananjay Ramchandra Gadgil (1901–1971), Indian economist, institution builder and the vice chairman of the Planning Commission of India
Ganesh Gadgil (1815–1890), Indian jeweller, founder of P. N. Gadgil Jewellers & Sons in Sangli
Gangadhar Gopal Gadgil (1923–2008), Marathi writer from Maharashtra, India
Madhav Gadgil (born 1942), Indian ecologist, academic, writer, columnist and the founder of the Centre for Ecological Sciences
Monica Gadgil, contestant on Fame Gurukul, an Indian prime-time show on Sony Entertainment Television (India)
Narhar Vishnu Gadgil (1896–1966), Indian freedom fighter and politician from Maharashtra, India
Purshottam Narayan Gadgil (1874–1954), Indian jeweller, namesake of P. N. Gadgil Jewellers
Sulochana Gadgil (born 1944), Indian meteorologist at the Centre for Atmospheric and Oceanic Sciences (CAOS) in Bangalore, India
Vitthalrao Gadgil (1928–2001), politician in  cabinet of  Indian National Congress run government

See also
Gadgil Committee (WGEEP), an environmental research commission appointed by the Ministry of Environment and Forests of India, chaired by Madhav Gadgil
Gadgil formula, named after Dhananjay Ramchandra Gadgil, a social scientist and the first critic of Indian planning
Gagil, Yap
Gagal, Iran

References 

Indian surnames
Marathi-language surnames